Kritzinger is a surname. Notable people with the surname include:

Friedrich Wilhelm Kritzinger (1816–1890) German theologian, teacher and songwriter
Friedrich Wilhelm Kritzinger (1890–1947), German official
Inus Kritzinger (born 1989), South African rugby union player
JC Kritzinger (born 1987), South African rugby union player
Klippies Kritzinger (1948–2016), South African rugby union player
Pieter Hendrik Kritzinger (1870–1930), South African general 
Wessel Kritzinger (born 1944), South African Army general